Zelotus Abijah Cotton was an American from Milwaukee, Wisconsin who served a single one-year term as a Democratic member of the Wisconsin State Assembly, in 1849, from Milwaukee County.

On September 27, 1846 he married Ellen A. Lee in Milwaukee.

References 

Politicians from Milwaukee
Democratic Party members of the Wisconsin State Assembly